History Nebraska, formerly the Nebraska State Historical Society is a Nebraska state agency, founded in 1878 to "encourage historical research and inquiry, spread historical information ... and to embrace alike aboriginal and modern history."  It was designated a state institution in 1883, and upgraded to a state agency in 1994. The agency rebranded and announced their name change to History Nebraska on April 30, 2018.

The agency's mission statement is "[to] collect, preserve, and open to all, the histories we share." The agency developed a process for the return of human remains, burial objects and cultural items of 1,400 individuals in accordance with the Native American Graves Protection and Repatriation Act of 1990.

State Historic Sites 

Facilities and operations of the society include:

History Nebraska also operates the Gerald R. Ford Conservation Center in Omaha.

See also 
 National Register of Historic Places listings in Nebraska
 List of National Historic Landmarks in Nebraska
 Nebraska Game and Parks Commission, manages several Nebraska State Historical Sites and Parks
 University of Nebraska
 Pony Express Bible

References

External links
 Official website

 
Nebraska, History
1878 establishments in Nebraska
State agencies of Nebraska
Historical societies in Nebraska
Organizations established in 1878